Visa requirements for Swiss citizens are administrative entry restrictions by the authorities of other states placed on citizens of Switzerland. As of 13 April 2021, Swiss citizens had visa-free or visa-on-arrival access to 187 countries and territories, ranking the Swiss passport 7th in terms of travel freedom (tied with the passports of Belgium, New Zealand, the United Kingdom, and the United States), and the highest of the EFTA member states, according to the 2021 Henley Passport Index.

As a member state of the European Free Trade Association (EFTA), Swiss citizens enjoy freedom of movement to live and work in Iceland, Norway and Liechtenstein in accordance with the EFTA convention. Moreover, by virtue of Switzerland's bilateral agreements with the EU, Swiss citizens also have freedom of movement in all EU member states. All EFTA and EU citizens are not only visa-exempt but are legally entitled to enter and reside in each other's countries.

In order to travel to another country, a Swiss citizen requires a passport, except travel to EFTA and EU countries, European microstates, Greenland (de facto), Turkey, and on organized tours to Tunisia, where the Swiss identity card is valid.

Visa requirements map

Visa requirements

Consular protection of Swiss citizens abroad

The Federal Department of Foreign Affairs (FDFA) (German: Eidgenössisches Departement für auswärtige Angelegenheiten EDA,  French: Département fédéral des affaires étrangères DFAE, Italian: Dipartimento federale degli affari esteri DFAE,) regularly publishes travel warnings on its website and allows Swiss citizens to register on the online portal itineris or the mobile app Travel Admin before they travel abroad. Registered persons will receive a message if the situation in their destination country changes  for the worse.

Since 1919, Switzerland has also represented Liechtenstein in countries where Liechtenstein does not maintain consular representation. Liechtenstein maintains a very small network of diplomatic missions; four embassies in Central Europe, and one embassy in North America.

Non-visa restrictions

See also

 Swiss passport
 Visa requirements for EFTA nationals
 Visa policy of the Schengen Area
 Swiss nationality law

References and Notes
References

Notes

Foreign relations of Switzerland
Switzerland